Fred "Freddie" Rodriguez (born September 3, 1973) is an American former professional road racing cyclist. His nickname, Fast Freddie, is due to his reputation as a sprint specialist. Rodriguez won the United States National Road Race Championships four times, and won four stages at the Tour de Georgia. He competed in the men's individual road race at the 2000 Summer Olympics.

Other notable results include high stage finishes in all three Grand Tours as well as second places in both in both Milan–San Remo and Gent–Wevelgem in 2002. Rodriguez participated in all three Grand Tours including the Giro d'Italia and Vuelta a España one time each where he had multiple stage podiums in the Vuelta and won stage 9 of the 2004 Giro d'Italia. He started the Tour de France seven times finishing it twice, and while he never won any stages he was often competitive on sprint stages with several top 5's.

Rodriguez retired at the end of the 2015 season.

Major results

1991
 1st  Road race, National Junior Road Championships
1995
 1st Lancaster Classic
 1st Stage 3b Regio-Tour
 2nd Redlands Bicycle Classic
 3rd  Road race, Pan American Games
1996
 1st International Cycling Classic
 1st Stage 5 Tour of China
 2nd Road race, National Road Championships
 3rd US Pro Championship
1997
 1st Stage 4 Redlands Bicycle Classic
 8th Overall Internationale Niedersachsen-Rundfahrt
1998
 7th Overall Tour de Langkawi
1st Stages 2 & 5
1999
 1st Schaal Sels
 1st Stage 1b Tour de Langkawi
 2nd Road race, National Road Championships
 4th Overall G.P. Portugal Telecom
 5th Overall Volta ao Algarve
 6th Philadelphia International Championship
 8th Overall Settimana Internazionale Coppi e Bartali
 8th Giro del Piemonte
2000
 1st  Road race, National Road Championships
 1st First Union Classic
 Tour de Suisse
1st  Points classification
1st Stage 2
 2nd Overall Niedersachsen-Rundfahrt
1st Stages 7 & 10
 2nd US Pro Championship
 3rd Overall UNIQA Classic
1st Points classification
1st Stage 3
 3rd First Union Invitational
 4th GP de Fourmies
 10th Overall 4 Jours de Dunkerque
1st Stage 5
2001
 1st  Road race, National Road Championships
 1st Philadelphia International Championship
 1st US Pro Championship
 2nd GP de Fourmies
 3rd Overall Tour de Luxembourg
1st Stage 1
 3rd Grand Prix Pino Cerami
 4th Scheldeprijs
 8th Overall Guldensporentweedaagse
 8th First Union Classic
2002
 2nd Milan–San Remo
 2nd Gent–Wevelgem
 5th GP Ouest–France
 8th Overall Tour du Poitou-Charentes
 9th E3 Prijs Vlaanderen
2003
 2nd Overall Tour de Georgia
1st  Points classification
1st Stages 3 & 4
 2nd G.P. Costa degli Etruschi
 4th Overall International Tour of Rhodes
1st Stage 2
 4th Reading Classic
 4th Wachovia Classic
 9th Paris–Tours
2004
 1st  Road race, National Road Championships
 1st Wachovia Classic
 1st Reading Classic
 1st Stage 9 Giro d'Italia
 2nd Grand Prix of San Francisco
 2nd Coppa Bernocchi
 3rd Lancaster Classic
 3rd Wachovia Invitational
 8th Stausee-Rundfahrt Klingnau
2005
 2nd Lancaster Classic
 2nd Reading Classic
 2nd Wachovia Invitational
 2nd Wachovia Classic
 4th Road race, National Road Championships
 4th Overall GP Costa Azul
1st Stage 1
 4th Philadelphia International Championship
 6th Doha International GP
2006
 Tour de Georgia
1st  Points classification
1st Stage 4
2007
 1st Stage 6 Tour de Georgia
 1st Stage 3 Tour of Elk Grove
 4th Road race, National Road Championships
2008
 3rd Philadelphia International Championship
 6th Lancaster Classic
 6th Commerce Bank Lehigh Valley Classic
2011
 4th Overall Tour of Elk Grove
2012
 3rd Philadelphia International Championship
2013
 1st  Road race, National Road Championships
 7th Overall Nature Valley Grand Prix

Grand Tour general classification results timeline

Did not finish = DNF.

References

External links 
 

 Profile at Cycling News
 Palmarès at Cycling Base
 2011 Interview at Cycling News
 2012 Interview at Cycling News
 2013 Interview at Cycling Inquisition
 2013 Interview at Velo News 

1973 births
Living people
American Giro d'Italia stage winners
American male cyclists
Tour de Suisse stage winners
Sportspeople from Bogotá
Pan American Games medalists in cycling
Pan American Games bronze medalists for the United States
Cyclists at the 1995 Pan American Games
Olympic cyclists of the United States
Cyclists at the 2000 Summer Olympics
Medalists at the 1995 Pan American Games